Juan Carlos Arteche Gómez (11 April 1957 – 13 October 2010) was a Spanish footballer who played as a central defender.

A player of imposing physical presence with great aerial ability, he spent 11 years of his professional career with Atlético Madrid, appearing in nearly 400 competitive games for the club.

Club career
Born in Maliaño, Cantabria, Arteche began playing professionally with local Racing de Santander after starting in basketball and tennis. He made his debut in the 1976–77 season and appeared in 16 La Liga games as the club finished 15th, barely avoiding relegation.

After one more year with Racing, Arteche signed for Atlético Madrid, being an undisputed starter early on and team captain. In 1984–85, he helped the Colchoneros to the second position in the league only behind champions FC Barcelona, and the campaign's Copa del Rey; subsequently, they reached the final of the UEFA Cup Winners' Cup, a 0–3 loss against FC Dynamo Kyiv.

After only two matches in 1988–89, mainly due to serious personal problems with elusive Atlético chairman Jesús Gil, Arteche chose to retire at 32.

International career
Arteche won four caps for Spain in three months, his debut coming against Romania on 12 November 1986 for the UEFA Euro 1988 qualifiers. In his last appearance, he could not stop England's Gary Lineker from scoring all opposing goals, in the 2–4 friendly loss in Madrid.

Death
After a long battle with blood cancer, Arteche died in Madrid on 13 October 2010, at the age of 53.

Honours
Atlético Madrid
Copa del Rey: 1984–85; Runner-up 1986–87
Supercopa de España: 1985
UEFA Cup Winners' Cup: Runner-up 1985–86

References

External links

1957 births
2010 deaths
People from Camargo, Cantabria
Spanish footballers
Footballers from Cantabria
Association football defenders
La Liga players
Tercera División players
Racing de Santander players
Gimnástica de Torrelavega footballers
Atlético Madrid footballers
Spain under-23 international footballers
Spain international footballers